Lindsay Tipping (11 April 1950 – 7 March 1994) was an  Australian rules footballer who played with Hawthorn in the Victorian Football League (VFL).

Notes

External links 

1950 births
1994 deaths
Australian rules footballers from Victoria (Australia)
Hawthorn Football Club players